The 2000 Speedway Grand Prix of Europe was the sixth and the last race of the 2000 Speedway Grand Prix season. It took place on 23 September in the Polonia Stadium in Bydgoszcz, Poland

Starting positions draw 

The Speedway Grand Prix Commission nominated Polish rider Jaroslaw Hampel and a Piotr Protasiewicz as Wild Card.

Heat details

Final standings

See also 
 Speedway Grand Prix
 List of Speedway Grand Prix riders

References

External links 
 FIM-live.com
 SpeedwayWorld.tv

E
2000
2000
Speedway Grand Prix Of Europe, 2000